Cychrus shanxiensis is a species of ground beetle in the subfamily of Carabinae. It was described by Deuve in 2005.

References

shanxiensis
Beetles described in 2005